The Karakum Canal (Qaraqum Canal, Kara Kum Canal, Garagum Canal; , Karakumskiy Kanal) in Turkmenistan is one of the largest irrigation and water supply canals in the world. Started in 1954, and completed in 1988, it is navigable over much of its  length, and carries  of water annually from the Amu-Darya River across the Karakum Desert in Turkmenistan. The canal opened up huge new tracts of land to agriculture, especially to cotton monoculture heavily promoted by the Soviet Union, and supplying Ashgabat with a major source of water. The canal is also a major factor leading to the Aral Sea environmental disaster. The Soviet regime planned to at some time extend the canal to the Caspian Sea.

History
The current Karakum Canal was not the first major attempt to bring the Amu-Darya water to the Karakums. In the early 1950s, construction began on the Main Turkmen Canal, which would start at a much more northerly location (near Nukus), and run southwest toward Krasnovodsk. The canal would have used around 25 percent of the Amu-Darya's water. The works were abandoned after the death of Joseph Stalin, the current Karakum Canal route being chosen instead.
Reservoirs such as Hanhowuz Reservoir were created to help regulate it.

Important cities
Ashgabat
Bereket
Serdar

External links
Google Earth view of part of the Karakum Canal, and desert area irrigated by it
Map of Karakum Canal (annotated in Russian alphabet)

References

 

Canals in Turkmenistan
Buildings and structures built in the Soviet Union
Irrigation canals
Cotton
Agriculture in Turkmenistan
Irrigation in Turkmenistan
Interbasin transfer
Canals opened in 1988